Vanderpool Farm Complex is a historic home and barn located at Guilderland in Albany County, New York.  The house was built about 1855 and has a two-story main block with -story ell.  It features a classical, recessed center entrance with side lights and transom.  The Dutch barn was built about 1800 and a small shed connects it to the adjacent small English barn.

It was listed on the National Register of Historic Places in 1982.

References

Farms on the National Register of Historic Places in New York (state)
Houses in Albany County, New York
National Register of Historic Places in Albany County, New York